Jan Willem de Winter (French: Jean Guillaume de Winter, 23 March 1761 – 2 June 1812) was a Dutch admiral during the Napoleonic Wars.

Biography

Early life 
De Winter was born in Kampen and entered naval service at a young age. He distinguished himself by his zeal and courage, and by the time of the Patriottentijd in 1787 had reached the rank of lieutenant. The overthrow of the Patriot party forced him to flee to France.

Naval career 
Here he threw himself heart and soul into the cause of the French Revolution, and took part under Charles François Dumouriez and Charles Pichegru in the campaigns of 1792 and 1793, and was soon promoted to the rank of brigadier-general.

In 1795, when Pichegru overran the Dutch Republic, De Winter returned with the French army to his native country. The new regime now utilized the experience he had gained as a naval officer by giving him the post of adjunct-general for the reorganization of the Batavian Navy. In 1796 he was appointed vice-admiral and commander-in-chief of the fleet. He spared no efforts to strengthen it and improve its condition, and on 11 October 1797 he ventured upon an encounter off Camperdown with the British fleet under Admiral Adam Duncan.

After an obstinate struggle the Dutch were defeated, and De Winter himself was taken prisoner. He remained in England until December, when he gave his parole and was released. His conduct in the Battle of Camperdown was declared by a court-martial to have nobly maintained the honour of the Dutch flag.

Ambassador 
From 1798 to 1802 De Winter filled the post of ambassador to the French Republic, and was then once more appointed commander of the fleet. He was sent with a strong squadron to the Mediterranean to repress the Tripoli pirates, and negotiated a treaty of peace with the Tripolitan government. He enjoyed the confidence of Louis Bonaparte, then King of Holland, and, after the incorporation of the Netherlands in the French empire, in an equal degree of the emperor Napoleon. By the former he was created Marshal of Holland and Count of Huessen, and given the command of the armed forces both by sea and land.

Later life 
Napoleon gave him the grand cross of the Legion of Honour and appointed him inspector general of the northern coasts, and in 1811 he placed him at the head of the fleet he had collected at Texel. Soon afterwards De Winter was taken ill and compelled to go to Paris, where he died on 2 June 1812. He had a splendid public funeral and was buried in the Panthéon. His heart was enclosed in an urn and placed in the Bovenkerk Church in Kampen.

Notes

References 

 
 

1761 births
1812 deaths
18th-century Dutch people
19th-century Dutch people
Admirals of the navy of the Dutch Republic
Burials at the Panthéon, Paris
Dutch military commanders of the Napoleonic Wars
Dutch military personnel of the French Revolutionary Wars
French naval commanders of the Napoleonic Wars
People of the Patriottentijd
People from Kampen, Overijssel
Royal Netherlands Navy personnel
18th-century Dutch military personnel